Nister is an Ortsgemeinde – a community belonging to a Verbandsgemeinde – in the Westerwaldkreis in Rhineland-Palatinate, Germany.

Geography

The community lies north of Hachenburg on the river Große Nister. Nister belongs to the Verbandsgemeinde of Hachenburg, a kind of collective oligarchy. Its seat is in the like-named town.

History
In 1270, Nister had its first documentary mention.

Politics

The municipal council is made up of 16 council members, including the extraofficial mayor (Bürgermeister), who were elected in a municipal election on 13 June 2004.

Economy and infrastructure

Transport
Nister is linked to the long-distance road network over Bundesstraße 414. The Autobahn interchanges Mogendorf and Dierdorf on the A 3 (Cologne–Frankfurt) can be reached over Bundesstraßen 8 and 413. The nearest InterCityExpress stop is the railway station at Montabaur on the Cologne-Frankfurt high-speed rail line.

Public institutions
The community has at its disposal the Nauberghalle with various spaces to accommodate different activities, a football field, a tennis court with three places, a playing field with a streetball area, two children's playgrounds and an extensive hiking path network.

References

External links
Nister in the collective municipality’s Web pages 

Westerwaldkreis